Yassin al-Haj Saleh (born 1961) is a Syrian writer and political dissident. He writes on political, social and cultural subjects relating to Syria and the Arab world.

From 1980 until 1996, he spent time in prison in Syria for his membership in the left-wing opposition group Syrian Communist Party (Political Bureau), which he calls a "communist pro-democracy group". However, he has also stated that his time in prison allowed him to break out of the "internal prisons [of] narrow political affiliation [and] rigid ideology" and has called the Syrian revolution an "open-ended and multi-leveled struggle", while remaining supportive of aspects of Marxism. He was arrested while he was studying medicine in Aleppo and spent sixteen years in prison, the last in Tadmur Prison. He took his final examination as a general medical practitioner in 2000, but never practiced.

In addition to being known for his own published books and articles, he also helped launch the bilingual publication AlJumhuriya.net (est. 2012), lauded by journalist Kim Ghattas as "an online Arabic news platform that is one of the best sources of information and analysis in the region."

He has been granted a Prince Claus Award for 2012 as "actually a tribute to the Syrian people and the Syrian revolution. He was unable to collect the award as he was then hiding among the Syrian underground. He was awarded Swedish Tucholsky Prize in 2017. He was one of the talkers in a two-day anti-capitalist forum, which was held in Ankara, Turkey, on Nov 23-24, 2013. Additionally, he was speaking at the event 'Reporting Change - Stories from the Arab region' in Amsterdam on 15 June 2014, an event jointly organized by Human Rights Watch and World Press Photo.

Al-Haj Saleh is married to Samira Khalil, a communist dissident, former political detainee and a revolutionary activist who was abducted in Douma in December 2013. After 21 months of hiding in Damascus and whole Syria, for being wanted by both the government and radical Islamist militants, he fled to Turkey and lived in Istanbul until 2017. Al-Haj Saleh is now a fellow at Berlin Institute for Advanced Study (Wissenschaftskolleg zu Berlin).

Works
One of the most influential Arab writers and dissidents as well as a prominent intellectual voice of the Syrian revolution, Yassin Al-Haj Saleh writes on political, social and cultural subjects relating to Syria and the Arab world for several Arab newspapers and journals outside of Syria, and regularly contributes to the London-based Al-Hayat newspaper, the Egyptian leftist magazine Al-Bosla, and the Syrian online periodical The Republic.

Among his books (the majority in Arabic):

 Syria in the Shadow: Glimpses Inside the Black Box (2009, Dar Jidar);
 Walking on One Foot (2011, Dar al-Adab, Beirut), a collection of 52 essays about Syrian affairs, written between 2006 and 2010;
 Salvation O Boys: 16 Years in Syrian Prisons (2012, Dar al-Saqi, Beirut);
 The Myths of the Latters: A Critique of Contemporary Islam and a Critique of its Critique (2012, Dar al-Saqi, Beirut);
 Deliverance or Destruction? Syria at a Crossroads (2014, Cairo Institute for Human Rights Studies);
 The Impossible Revolution: Making Sense of the Syrian Tragedy (2017, Hurst Publishers, London) [In English].

See also 

 Yassin al-Haj Saleh's articles (2013–2021) on AlJumhuriya.net

References

External links
Column archive (2004-2005), The Daily Star
Column archive (2006), New Statesman
Column archive (2010-2011) at Jadaliyya
Drivers of U.S. Syrian Relations Under the Obama Administration, Yassin Al-Haj Saleh, Carnegie Endowment, June 2009
The Political Culture Of Modern Syria: Its Formation, Structure & Interactions, Yasin Al-Haj Saleh, "Political Culture Case Studies", Conflict Studies Research Centre, published in Mafhoum, 2003
A General Socio-Political View of Contemporary Syrian Society, Yassin al-Haj Saleh, Ahewar, 22 October 2010
Prisoner of Damascus, Yassin al-Haj Saleh, The New York Times, 10 April 2011
Interviews
Assad's Forgotten Man, Michael Young, Reason, 5 May 2005
On Syria: Interview with Yassin Al Haj Saleh, Sinan Antoon, Jadaliyya, 4 April 2011
The Conscience of Syria, March 2014 in the boston review
Articles
(Former) Communists for Liberal Democracy, As'ad AbuKhalil, MRZine, 12 April 2011
Free Syrian Translators: a collection of articles by Yassin al-Haj Saleh translated into English

1961 births
Living people
People from Damascus
People of the Syrian civil war
Prisoners and detainees of Syria
Syrian bloggers
Syrian communists
Syrian democracy activists
Syrian dissidents
Syrian Marxists
Syrian prisoners and detainees
University of Aleppo alumni